After the victory of rebel liberal leader Francisco Morazán in 1829 by taking Guatemala City and thus ending the Central American Civil War, Morazán urged the Congress for new elections. This were held in 1830.

Main candidates were conservative leader José Cecilio del Valle and Morazán himself. After the election Morazán obtained 202 electoral votes and Valle 103, still less than required for both to win according to the Constitution (same that happened in the 1825 election) though this time the liberal-dominated Congress chose to respect the popular vote, which favoured Morazán, proclaiming him president for a four-year term. Valle accepted the results.

References

1830
1830 elections in North America
1830 in Central America